Haloxylon scoparium (syns. Arthrophytum scoparium and Hammada scoparia) is a species of flowering plant in the family Amaranthaceae, native to semiarid north Africa and the Middle East. In flat areas it is often one of the dominant species.

References

Amaranthaceae
Flora of Mauritania
Flora of North Africa
Flora of Sinai
Flora of Lebanon
Flora of Palestine (region)
Flora of Iraq
Plants described in 1875